Madness in the Method is a 2019 American crime comedy film directed by and starring Jason Mewes, written by Chris Anastasi and Dominic Burns and produced by Rob Weston and Burns through Autumnwood Media in association with Happy Hour Productions. The film is Mewes's debut as a director. Mewes and several other cast members play fictional versions of themselves.

Plot
Character actor Jason Mewes struggles to gain legitimacy as an actor, as he has been typecast for decades with Kevin Smith as Jay and Silent Bob in the latter's View Askewniverse films. He decides to try method acting to reinvent himself, but it has negative effects on his sanity after he accidentally kills a director.

Cast
 Jason Mewes as himself aka Jay
 Kevin Smith as himself aka Silent Bob
 Teri Hatcher as Gina
 Matt Willis as Anthony Costalino
 Jaime Camil as Fernando
 Vinnie Jones as himself
 Gina Carano as Carrie
 Danny Trejo as himself
 Stan Lee as himself
 Matthew Sterling Nye as George 
 Mickey Gooch Jr as Detective Arnold
 Dean Cain as Dean
 Zach Galligan as Zach/Director 
 Casper Van Dien as Tim
 David Dastmalchian as The Witness
 Harley Quinn Smith as herself
 Evanna Lynch as Abbie Fox
 Roxy Striar as Connie
 Brian O'Halloran as himself
 Esther Anderson as Georgie M. Anderson
 Blake Harrison as Oliver
 Judd Nelson as Miscreant
 Nick Nicotera as Esteban
 Paul Chowdhry as Store Clerk

Release
In May 2019, Cinedigm acquired North American rights to Madness in the Method. The distributor released the film on August 2 in a day-and-date platform release in theaters and on digital.

References

External links
 
 
 

2019 films
2010s crime comedy films
American crime comedy films
Films about actors
Films set in Los Angeles
Films shot in Derbyshire
Films shot in Los Angeles
2019 directorial debut films
2019 comedy films
2010s English-language films
2010s American films